USCGC Munro has been the name of more than one United States Coast Guard ship, and may refer to:

 , commissioned in 1971 and decommissioned in 2021
 , launched in 2015

United States Coast Guard ship names